Austin Claunch (born November 17, 1989) is an American college basketball coach, and current head coach of the Nicholls Colonels men's basketball team.

Playing career
Claunch played four years at Emory, where he was a three-time First Team All-University Athletic Association selection, finishing his career with the Eagles as the school's all-time assists leader, and ranking eighth all-time in career points.

Coaching career
After graduation, Claunch spent the 2012–13 season as the director of player development under Paul Hewitt at George Mason, and from 2013 to 2015 served as a graduate manager at Clemson before being named the assistant video services director for the Tigers for the 2015–16 season.

Claunch earned his first collegiate assistant coaching position at Nicholls State, joining Richie Riley's staff. After two seasons as an assistant, he was elevated to the head coaching position at Nicholls when Riley accepted the head coaching position at South Alabama.

Claunch was named the Colonels' 12th head coach on March 29, 2018.

Across two seasons at the helm, the Houston native has accumulated a 35–27 overall record along with a 22–16 mark in Southland Conference play, leading the Colonels to a ninth-place finish in 2018–19 before making a second-place run just a year later in 2019–20.

Notably, the Red & Gray exceeded expectations during the 2019–20 campaign, upending the league's preseason 11th-place projection as the team secured 20-plus victories for just the fourth time in program history. Claunch & Co. kicked off the year with some flair, nearly knocking off Illinois in the season opener before upsetting Pitt on the road just days later; additionally, the Colonels challenged both No. 23 LSU (10-point loss) and mid-major power Rhode Island (five-point loss) in their own houses, leading each on numerous occasions throughout the contests.

Claunch spent the 2016 and 2017 seasons as an assistant, contributing heavily to the Colonels historic 2017–18 campaign that included the most wins (21) since 1995 and best Southland Conference record (15–3) since 1998. 
 
"I am beyond excited to be named the next head basketball coach at Nicholls," Claunch said. "The people of this university and all of Thibodaux have embraced me and treated me like family since the first day I arrived two years ago. I am ready to give the community a winning program built on enthusiasm, accountability and hard work. The foundation has been laid, and the future is extremely bright. I am truly humbled and honored to be leading our basketball program into the next phase."

At Nicholls as an assistant, Claunch was primarily responsible for guard development, specifically point guards, working daily with seniors Roddy Peters (SLC Newcomer of the Year, First Team), Jahvaughn Powell (All-SLC Defensive Team), Lafayette Rutledge (Single-season 3-point record holder) and Tevon Saddler (All-SLC Second Team). He was also the key recruiter for Kevin Johnson and Ryghe Lyons, who both started over 15 games as freshmen.

Claunch's impact at Nicholls was immediately felt as it was his scout that helped the Colonels knock off Boston College 79–73 on Nov. 11, 2016. He worked closely with Riley on offensive and defensive schemes and gameplans. Claunch created, orchestrated and conducted all basketball camps for the Colonels over the past two years.

Claunch came to Nicholls after spending a season as Assistant Video Services Director for Clemson men's basketball. Claunch spent three seasons with the Tigers overall, having previously served as a graduate manager from 2013–15. Prior to his time with Clemson, Claunch spent the 2012–13 season as the Director of Player Development for George Mason University.
 
Claunch was part of a Clemson staff that saw the Tigers improve by 10 wins over their previous season, compiling a 23–13 overall record. Clemson advanced to the NIT semifinals for the first time since 2007 and won 10 ACC games as well.

He helped Jaron Blossomgame to First Team All-ACC honors and the ACC's Most Improved Player award. The 6-7 forward raised his points-per-game average from 13.1 to 18.7 and his 3-point field goal percentage from 28% to 45% during his junior season. Claunch also helped K.J. McDaniels to a First Team All-ACC junior season. The 6-6 forward was named ACC Defensive Player of the Year and declared early for the 2014 NBA Draft.

At George Mason, Claunch worked under former Georgia Tech Head Coach Paul Hewitt. He assisted in all areas of individual workouts and practice, in addition to helping with film breakdown and exchange, scouting reports, academic scheduling and updating the team's recruiting database.

Claunch has assisted with various summer camps over the past several years. Each summer from 2007 to 2011, he worked with former NBA player and longtime Head Coach John Lucas at his camps in Houston, Texas. He also interned in the summer of 2010 with Joe Abunassar and Impact Basketball. From 2008–10, Claunch assisted his father's 15U and 16U Adidas Houston Select Basketball Club teams.

Claunch was a four-year starter and two-time captain at Emory University on the Division III level from 2008–12. He ranks first in Emory history in career assists (580), assists per game (5.8) and minutes played (3,132). Claunch is also second in free throw percentage (.877). He was also a three-time All-Conference First Team player at Emory, and a member of the University Athletic Association's 25th Anniversary Team. Claunch set the school's three best single-season assist totals over each of his final three seasons.

He played high school basketball at Strake Jesuit College Preparatory in Houston, Texas, and was a three-year starter and two-time team captain. Claunch was also a two-time all-district selection and led Strake Jesuit to the 2008 district crown as a senior. He was a two-time recipient of the Strake's Kenneth McGregor Award, based on his leadership and dedication on and off the court.

The Houston native earned his undergraduate degree in political science, with a minor in religion, from Emory in 2012. Claunch obtained a master's degree in human resource development from Clemson in August 2015.

Head coaching record

NCAA DI

References

1989 births
Living people
American men's basketball coaches
American men's basketball players
Basketball coaches from Texas
Basketball players from Texas
College men's basketball head coaches in the United States
Emory Eagles men's basketball players
Nicholls Colonels men's basketball coaches
People from Cypress, Texas
Sportspeople from Harris County, Texas